Vicente Pérez Madrid (born 11 July 1986 in Aspe, Province of Alicante) is a Spanish footballer who plays as a midfielder for Novelda CF.

External links

1986 births
Living people
People from Vinalopó Mitjà
Sportspeople from the Province of Alicante
Spanish footballers
Footballers from the Valencian Community
Association football midfielders
Segunda División players
Segunda División B players
Tercera División players
Hércules CF players
Valencia CF Mestalla footballers
Granada CF footballers
Gimnàstic de Tarragona footballers
CD Leganés players
CD Guadalajara (Spain) footballers
CD Numancia players
UCAM Murcia CF players
CF Fuenlabrada footballers
CD Alcoyano footballers
Novelda CF players